The papillary muscles are muscles located in the ventricles of the heart.  They attach to the cusps of the atrioventricular valves (also known as the mitral and tricuspid valves) via the chordae tendineae and contract to prevent inversion or prolapse of these valves on systole (or ventricular contraction). The papillary muscles constitute about 10% of the total heart mass.

Structure
There are five total papillary muscles in the heart; three in the right ventricle and two in the left.  The anterior, posterior, and septal papillary muscles of the right ventricle each attach via chordae tendineae to the tricuspid valve.  The anterolateral and posteromedial papillary muscles of the left ventricle attach via chordae tendineae to the mitral valve.

Blood supply
The mitral valve papillary muscles in the left ventricle are called the anterolateral and posteromedial muscles.
 Anterolateral muscle blood supply: left anterior descending artery - diagonal branch (LAD) and left circumflex artery - obtuse marginal branch (LCX)
 Posteromedial muscle blood supply: right coronary artery - posterior interventricular artery (RCA)
The posteromedial muscle ruptures more frequently because it only has one source of blood supply, hence RCA occlusion can cause papillary muscle rupture.

Function
The papillary muscles of both the right and left ventricles begin to contract shortly before ventricular systole and maintain tension throughout. This prevents regurgitation—backward flow of ventricular blood into the atrial cavities—by bracing the atrioventricular valves against prolapse—being forced back into the atria by the high pressure in the ventricles.

Clinical significance
Papillary muscle rupture can be caused by a myocardial infarct, and dysfunction can be caused by ischemia. Both complications may lead to worsening of mitral regurgitation.

Additional images

See also
Trabeculae carneae

References

External links
 } — "Heart: The Right Atrioventricular (Tricupsid) Valve" (anterior, posterior, septal papillary muscles)
  — "Heart: The Left Atrioventricular (Mitral) Valve" (anterior, posterior papillary muscles)
 } — "Right atrioventricular bundle branch, anterior view"
 Definition of Papillary muscle
 MedicineNet Search Results

Cardiac anatomy